The New York University Graduate School of Arts and Science (GSAS) is a school within New York University (NYU) founded in 1886 by Henry Mitchell MacCracken, establishing NYU as the second academic institution in the United States to grant Ph.D. degrees on academic performance and examination. The School is housed in the Silver Center, several departments have their own buildings and houses around Washington Square. The graduate program at Courant Institute of Mathematical Sciences, although run independently, is formally associated with the graduate school.

Along with the Steinhardt School of Culture, Education, and Human Development and the New York University Institute of Fine Arts, the Graduate School participates in the Inter-University Doctoral Consortium (IUDC), which allows doctoral students to cross-register at member institutions. Participating schools are CUNY Graduate Center, Fordham University, New School for Social Research, Columbia University, Princeton University, Rutgers University, and Stony Brook University.

Academics
There are approximately 1,600 Ph.D. students and 3,000 master's students enrolled in the Graduate School. Students hail from more than 200 undergraduate institutions, all fifty states, and from more than 100 other countries. GSAS has one of the largest and most diverse international student populations in the United States. International students represent between 40% and 45% of the student body. GSAS offers 48 programs and many interdisciplinary and advanced degrees, including doctorates, master's, and certificates.

The following Departments and Programs are offered:

Notable alumni
For a list of notable Alumni and Professors of the NYU Graduate School of Arts and Sciences, see List of NYU GSAS People. See also List of New York University People.

References

External links
 
NYU Arts and Science Alumni Blog

Arts and Sciences
Educational institutions established in 1886
1886 establishments in New York (state)
Science and technology in New York City
Liberal arts colleges at universities in the United States